Kerkebet Subregion or Carcabat District is a subregion in the northwestern Anseba region (Zoba Anseba) of Eritrea. Its capital lies at Kerkebet (Carcabat).

References

Subregions of Eritrea

Anseba Region
Subregions of Eritrea